Louis-François Ribié (1758 in Paris – 1830 in Martinique), also known as César Ribié, was a French actor and theatre manager.

External links 
 Louis-François Ribié on Data.bnf.fr
  Louis-François Ribié on Wikisource
 Ribié's plays and their presentations on CÉSAR

Male actors from Paris
1758 births
1830 deaths
French theatre managers and producers
Directors of La Monnaie
18th-century French male actors
19th-century French male actors
French male stage actors
18th-century French dramatists and playwrights